Bicker Gauntlet is a village in Lincolnshire, England. It is in the civil parish of Bicker.

External links

Villages in Lincolnshire
Borough of Boston